Saitama 5th district is a constituency of the House of Representatives in the Diet of Japan (national legislature). It is located in Saitama Prefecture and covers Nishi, Kita, Minuma, Ōmiya and Chūō wards of the city of Saitama.

Yukio Edano of the Constitutional Democratic Party (CDP) has held the district since the 2000 general election. After the Democratic Party dissolved and split in 2017, Edano ascended to leadership of the centre-left CDP, which became the second-largest party in the House of Representatives in the 2017 general election.

Edano along with other DPJ candidates won all but one district in Saitama in the 2009 DPJ landslide, wiping out the Liberal Democratic Party (LDP) from the prefecture. Their fortunes were reversed in the 2012 general election. Edano was the only member of the Democratic Party of Japan (DPJ) in Saitama prefecture to retain his seat, as the party lost two-thirds of its seats nationwide amid a poor economy and relative geopolitical decline. While losing the race, Edano's resurgent LDP opponent Hideki Makihara managed to gain a proportional block seat. The margin closed down further in the 2014 election and Makihara was only within 3,300 votes from unseating Edano. Makihara was unable to overcome the margin in the 2017 election following the nationwide surge of the Edano-led CDP. Edano was re-elected with a comfortable 20.28% majority.

List of representatives

Election results

References 

Districts of the House of Representatives (Japan)